WFMU is a listener-supported, independent community radio station, licensed to East Orange, New Jersey. Since 1998 its studios and operating facilities have been headquartered in Jersey City, New Jersey. It broadcasts locally at 91.1 Mhz FM, in the Hudson Valley, the Lower Catskills, western New Jersey, and eastern Pennsylvania from Mount Hope, New York at 90.1 WMFU, and to New York City and Rockland County at 91.9 FM. It is the longest-running free-form radio station in the U.S.  The station's main terrestrial transmitter is located in West Orange, New Jersey.

Philosophy and influence
WFMU does not belong to any existing public broadcasting network, and nearly 100% of its programming originates at the radio station.

WFMU has a stated commitment to unstructured-format broadcasting. All programming is created by each individual air personality, and is not restricted by any type of station-wide playlist or rotation schedule. Experimentation, spontaneity and humor are among the station's most frequently noted distinguishing traits. Unlike most commercial broadcasting and non-commercial educational radio stations, WFMU does not offer regularly scheduled news, weather, traffic, sports, or financial information. 

"WFMU is a place where the Singing Dogs are just as important as Elvis; a place where you will, in fact, hear Elvis, but in close proximity to ritual disinterment music from Sumatra, the soundtrack from Mothra, a theremin band called the Lothars, and the intergalactic jazz improvisations of the Sun Ra Arkestra," wrote Jaime Wolf in a 1999 New York Times station profile.

WFMU was named "Best Radio Station in the Country" by Rolling Stone magazine for four consecutive years: 1991 to 1994. and has also been dubbed the best radio station in either NYC or the US by The Village Voice, New York Press, and CMJ, among others. The station also won three awards ("Best Specialty Programming", "Most Eclectic Programming", and "Music Director Most Likely To Never Sell Out") at the 2006 CMJ College Radio Awards.

Notable history
In April 1958, WFMU commenced broadcasting as a radio station licensed to Upsala College in East Orange, New Jersey. Initially a student-staffed and faculty-administered college radio operation, by the 1980s most of the station's staff had no affiliation with the college, and the station's management, though hired by the college, had little involvement with the academic community.

In December 1983, Ken Freedman joined WFMU as a DJ and succeeded Bruce Longstreet as general manager in August 1985.

In 1989, WFMU successfully fended off a challenge to the station's license from four rival broadcasters, who claimed that WFMU was broadcasting above its legal power limit.

A 1990 telephone performance on WFMU by Daniel Johnston was the primary inspiration for filmmaker Jeff Feuerzeig to create the documentary film, The Devil and Daniel Johnston.

In late 1991, the late Jeff Buckley made his radio debut on WFMU and returned numerous times before signing with Columbia Records.

In 1992, the non-profit organization Auricle Communications was founded, which purchased WFMU's license from Upsala in 1994 one year prior to the college's bankruptcy in 1995.

In 1993 the station launched its website, and in 1997 it began streaming its broadcasts full-time.

In 1995, shortly before Upsala's bankruptcy filing and closure on May 31, 1995, a group of station executives, personnel, and supporters formed Auricle Communications. It became a fully independent radio station when Auricle bought the license from the college.

In August 1998, listener donations funded a new studio and office in Jersey City.

In May 2001, WFMU received worldwide attention when national and international media outlets covered DJ Glen Jones's successful attempt to break the Guinness World Record for longest consecutive radio broadcast, staying on the air a full 100 hours, 42 seconds.

In 2005, WFMU expanded its online broadcasting efforts by offering 15 hours a week of Internet-only live programming, as well as an independent 24-hour-a-day webcast of Nachum Segal's Jewish Moments In The Morning program.

In January 2006, WFMU announced the availability of the station's live stream and archives to cellular phones and other mobile devices running the operating systems Windows Mobile (Pocket PC) and Palm OS.

In November 2007, WFMU became the first radio station in the world to offer live streaming to the Apple iPhone.

From 2014 to 2015, a documentary on WFMU, Sex and Broadcasting: A Film About WFMU, screened at American film festivals and independent cinemas nationwide.

See also
 List of community radio stations in the United States
 List of WFMU hosts 
 WMFU – 90.1 FM, licensed to Mount Hope, New York

References

External links
 

WFMU in the American Archive of Public Broadcasting

FMU
Freeform radio stations
Culture of Jersey City, New Jersey
Mass media in Hudson County, New Jersey
Community radio stations in the United States
Radio stations established in 1958
Upsala College
1958 establishments in New Jersey